Randolph Central School Corporation is the largest public school district in Randolph County, Indiana.  It serves students in Franklin, Ward, and White River Townships and includes the City of Winchester and the incorporated towns of Ridgeville and Saratoga.  The corporation was organized in 1962 as a community school corporation under the provisions of Indiana's School Reorganization Act of 1959.  Currently (2013) the district includes one high school, Winchester Community High School, one middle school, Lee L. Driver Middle School, and three elementary schools, Oscar R. Baker School, Willard School, and Deerfield School.  The district is governed by a five-member board of school trustees. Mr. Rolland Abraham is the superintendent of the district.

References

Education in Randolph County, Indiana
School districts established in 1962
School districts in Indiana
1962 establishments in Indiana